Suddenly is a 2006 Swedish film directed by Johan Brisinger. The film was shot on the island Härmanö in Orust Municipality.

Plot
Jonas, his brother Erik, and his parents are a typical family. The normal stresses and worries and squabbles. Until tragedy strikes one day on the way to grandma's house. Jonas' world is shattered and worse yet, he's got to deal with it alone. His father, Lasse, is too distracted with his own grief to be much help. After his father's suicide attempt, they go to the family's summer house where Jonas meets the rather direct Helena. As the summer unfolds, Jonas finally learns how to grieve through his friendship with Helena.

Cast
 Anastasios Soulis - Jonas
 Michael Nyqvist - Lasse
 Moa Gammel - Helena
 Catherine Hansson - Lotta
 Sten Ljunggren - Sven
 Anita Wall - Svea

External links

Swedish drama films
2000s Swedish-language films
2000s Swedish films
2006 drama films